USS Puget Sound (CVE–113) was a  of the United States Navy.

She was laid down on 12 May 1944 at Todd-Pacific Shipyards, Inc., Tacoma, Washington; launched on 20 November 1944; sponsored by Mrs. Bert A. Teats of Sheridan, Oreg.; and commissioned on 18 June 1945 at Tacoma, Captain Charles F. Coe in command.

Service history
After trials and fitting out in the Puget Sound Naval Shipyard, Puget Sound steamed south on 6 July 1945 for shakedown out of San Diego, Calif., where she embarked Marine Air Group 6. She departed San Diego on 8 September for brief training in the Hawaiian Islands before proceeding to support the occupation of Japan.

Puget Sound entered Tokyo Bay on 14 October 1945. Her aircraft joined in the show of strength and conducted antimine patrols in support of the landings of the 10th Army at Matsuyama and Nagoya. Thence tactical training took her to the Philippines, Hong Kong, and the Marianas. Loading surplus aircraft in Apra Harbor, Guam, she put to sea on 6 January 1946 en route to Pearl Harbor, where she offloaded the surplus aircraft. At San Diego on 23 January, Marine Air Group 6 was detached and Puget Sound prepared to serve as a "Magic Carpet" home for Pacific war veterans.

From February–May 1946, Puget Sound made two "Magic Carpet" runs between San Diego and Pearl Harbor and one between Alameda, California and Okinawa, transporting 1,200 troops and surplus aircraft.

She steamed north on 24 May 1946 to prepare for inactivation, entering Puget Sound Naval Shipyard on 1 June. Decommissioning there on 18 October, she entered the Pacific Reserve Fleet at Tacoma. Her hull classification and number were changed to CVHE–113, effective 12 June 1955, and then to AKV–13, cargo ship and aircraft ferry. Struck from the Naval Vessel Register on 1 June 1960, she was sold for scrap on 10 January 1962 to Nicholai Joffee Corp.

References

External links
history.navy.mil: USS Puget Sound
navsource.org: USS Puget Sound
hazegray.org: USS Puget Sound

Commencement Bay-class escort carriers
World War II escort aircraft carriers of the United States
Ships built in Tacoma, Washington
1944 ships